Citibank N.A., Kingdom of Bahrain commonly known as Citibank Bahrain, is a franchise subsidiary of Citigroup, a multinational financial services corporation headquartered in New York City, United States. Citi Bahrain is connected by a network spanning 98 markets across the world. Citibank Bahrain also serves as the regional phone support call center for Citibank United Arab Emirates and Bahrain retail banking clients. The markets operations hub for Middle East and North Africa is also based out of Citibank Bahrain.

History
Initially providing commercial banking, the consumer banking arm of Citi Bahrain was launched in 1989.

In 1996, Citi Bahrain became the first international institution to set up a separately capitalized Islamic bank. Citi Islamic Investment Bank ("Citi Islamic"), based in Bahrain. Citi Islamic's offers Islamic financing and investment products and services.

With effect from 1 December 2022, Citibank, N.A., Bahrain Branch has transferred ownership of its consumer banking business in Bahrain to Ahli United Bank B.S.C. (Commercial Registration number 46348) ("AUB").

Branches
Citibank Bahrain has only one full-service branch in the district of Seef.

Products and services
Citi Bahrain offers consumers and institutions a range of financial products and services, including consumer banking and credit; corporate and investment banking; institutional equity research and sales; foreign exchange, credit cards, commercial banking; and treasury and trade solutions.

See also

List of banks in Bahrain

References

External links
Citibank Bahrain website

Citigroup
Banks of Bahrain